Mayoral elections were held in the Pitcairn Islands on 9 November 2016. Shawn Christian was re-elected as mayor, defeating Simon Young.

References

Pitcairn
Elections in the Pitcairn Islands
Mayoral